The Creative Workers Union of South Africa (CWUSA) was a trade union in South Africa. It was affiliated with the Congress of South African Trade Unions (COSATU). Its registration with the Department of Labour was cancelled on 9 May 2014.

References

  @baywatchnikki

Congress of South African Trade Unions
Trade unions in South Africa
Trade unions established in 2014